Hernán Larraín Matte (born 24 December 1974) is a Chilean lawyer and politician involved in centre-right politics. Larraín is an adjunct professor at the Adolfo Ibáñez University and during Sebastián Piñera's first government (2010–2014) he was presidential advisor. Then, he presided political party Evópoli (2018–2020).

He studied laws at Finis Terrae University (1993–1999) and after obtaining his BA, he decided to study a Master of Arts in Political Sciences in the Pontificia Universidad Católica de Chile (PUC; 2000–2001). Years later, he completed his Master in public policies at England's London School of Economics (LSE).

Biography
Born in 1974, he is the eldest son of Hernan Larraín and Magdalena Matte, politicians whose families have had a vast trajectory both into the Chilean elite and that country's right–wing. Likewise, Hernán is brother of the filmmakers Pablo Larraín and Juan de Dios Larraín.

Political career
In 2008, Larraín was general marketing coordinator of Sebastián Piñera's campaign for his first term as president. Following Piñera's victory at 2009 presidential election, he joined to Renovación Nacional (RN) in 2010 and became President's communications advisor since that year until 2013. That year he renounced to that position in order to join a political project linked to the think tank Horizontal (directed by him from 2013 to 2015), organization close to then nacient political party Evópoli, a conservative-liberal and centre-right party (where he finished joining). In December, he participated in the presidencial campaign of Evelyn Matthei (UDI) who lost against Michelle Bachelet from centre–left's Socialist Party of Chile.

On January 29, 2015, his party was one of the founding members of centre-right coalition Chile Vamos. In mid-2017, Larraín helped to Felipe Kast in the coalition's presidential primary that lost (15%) against Piñera (58%) and Manuel José Ossandón (26%). Months later, he participated in the campaign of Piñera during the presidential elections which he won.

On May 5, 2018, Larraín was elected president of Evópoli in the party's internal elections. On July 19, 2020, in the midst of Chile Vamos crisis (after 2019–20 Social Outbreak and COVID-19 pandemic), he formalized his resignation as president of the organization.

In 2021, he was registered as a candidate for the Constitutional Convention by District 11 (Las Condes, Vitacura, Lo Barnechea, La Reina y Peñalolén), and then won a seat into the Constitutional Convention that drafted a new constitution proposal for Chile.

On 4 July 2021, Larrain was invested as constituent. On 12 april 22, he assumed as adjunct vice president of the Convention.

References

External links
 

1974 births
Living people
Finis Terrae University alumni
Pontifical Catholic University of Chile alumni
Alumni of the London School of Economics
National Renewal (Chile) politicians
Evópoli politicians
Members of the Chilean Constitutional Convention